Sir Henry Knollys of Kingsbury, Warwickshire (ca. 1542 – 21 December 1582) was an English courtier, privateer and Member of Parliament.

Biography
He was born the eldest son of Sir Francis Knollys, Treasurer of the Royal Household, and Catherine Carey, Lady of the Bedchamber to Queen Elizabeth I. He was reputedly educated at Magdelen College, Oxford.

He entered Parliament in 1562 as MP for Reading in Berkshire and was re-elected for Reading in 1571. He served against the Northern rebels in 1569 and by 1570 had been appointed Esquire of the Body to Queen Elizabeth I. In 1572, together with his father, he became MP for Oxfordshire.

Around 1578, he joined Sir Humphrey Gilbert in a venture designed to set up a new colony on the east coast of North America although Henry showed more interest in the more profitable business of privateering in the Spanish Caribbean. Gilbert gathered eleven heavily armed ships and a crew of 600, many of them convicted pirates especially pardoned for the voyage. Knollys soon refused to acknowledge Sir Humphrey's authority and, together with the pirate John Callis, took three ships (later joined by more) to the Spanish Coast on a privateering expedition. The planned voyage across the Atlantic never came to pass and Gilbert complained to Sir Francis Walsingham of Knolly's "unkind and ill dealing". 

In 1582, an expedition to Portugal in support of Don Antonio, Prior of Crato, the Royal claimant to the throne, foundered when Henry was ordered to return home. He later joined his distant cousin John Norreys in the Netherlands to fight for Dutch independence but soon succumbed to wounds or disease.

Personal life
He had married, on 16 July 1565, Margaret, daughter and heiress of Sir Ambrose Cave, the Chancellor of the Duchy of Lancaster, and Margaret Willington. On the death of Sir Ambrose in 1568 he and his wife had inherited estates at Kingsbury, Warwickshire where they lived when in the Midlands. They had two daughters: Elizabeth, who married Sir Henry Willoughby of Risley, Derbyshire and Lettice, who married William Paget, 4th Baron Paget.

Ancestry

References

English privateers
Henry
1540s births
1582 deaths
People of the Elizabethan era
Carey family
Esquires of the Body
Members of the Parliament of England (pre-1707) for Reading
People from Rotherfield Greys
People from Reading, Berkshire
People from the Borough of North Warwickshire
English MPs 1563–1567
English MPs 1571
English MPs 1572–1583
Year of birth uncertain